Dance with Me is the fifth studio album by Canadian country music artist Johnny Reid. It was released on March 10, 2009, by Open Road Recordings. The album was certified Gold within 48 hours of release.

Track listing

Personnel 
 Richard Bennett – acoustic guitar, electric guitar
 Dan Dugmore – pedal steel, dobro
 Vicki Hampton – background vocals
 Jim Hoke – autoharp, pennywhistle, harmonica, accordion
 John Jarvis – piano
 Fats Kaplin – pedal steel, fiddle
 Tim Lauer – organ
 Brent Maher – acoustic guitar, percussion, background vocals
 Gordon Mote – piano, organ
 Louis Dean Nunley – background vocals
 Johnny Reid – lead vocals
 Tammy Rogers – violin, fiddle
 Mark Selby – acoustic guitar, electric guitar
 Glenn Worf – bass guitar
 Nir Z – drums, percussion
 The Nashville String Machine – strings
 Kevin Dailey - engineer

Chart performance

Weekly charts

Year-end charts

Singles

Certifications

References 

2009 albums
Johnny Reid albums
Open Road Recordings albums
Albums produced by Brent Maher
Canadian Country Music Association Album of the Year albums
Canadian Country Music Association Top Selling Canadian Album albums
Juno Award for Country Album of the Year albums